James Alfred Cotter (17 February 1959 – 5 September 1985) was a New Zealand rugby union and softball player.

Early life
Cotter was educated at Kuranui College in Greytown, and was a member of the school's 1st XV rugby team in 1976.

Sporting career
Cotter represented New Zealand in two sporting codes: rugby union and softball.

Rugby union
Cotter was a Junior All Black in 1978.

Softball
Cotter played 10 international games for the New Zealand men's national softball team between 1980 and 1984. A powerful batter, he has been described as "one of the greatest softballers produced by New Zealand".

Death and legacy
Cotter died on 5 September 1985 in a road crash on the Bombay Hills, south of Auckland.

Since Cotter's death, the Jimmy Cotter Memorial Trophy has been contested in representative rugby matches between Wairarapa Bush and Wellington. Cotter was inducted into the Softball New Zealand Hall of Fame in 1998. Another Jimmy Cotter Memorial Trophy is awarded by Softball New Zealand to the emerging player of the year.

References

1959 births
1985 deaths
People educated at Kuranui College
New Zealand rugby union players
Wairarapa Bush rugby union players
Wellington rugby union players
Rugby union fullbacks
Rugby union wings
Rugby union centres
Rugby union fly-halves
New Zealand softball players
Road incident deaths in New Zealand